Elton John: Me, Myself & I is a 2007 documentary filmed after the death of Elton John's good friend Diana and other soul shaking events that caused him to reassess his life. It is a candid appraisal by Elton John (tongue in cheek) of his fame, drug use, sexuality, and mistakenly taking his life for granted. It was filmed in Las Vegas, Nevada, United States

See also
Elton John: Tantrums & Tiaras

External links
 

Elton John
2007 television films
2007 films
British television documentaries
Documentary films about singers
Films shot in the Las Vegas Valley
Films directed by James Strong (director)
2000s British films